The Coralline Crag Formation is a geological formation in England. It is a series of marine deposits found near the North Sea coast of Suffolk and characterised by bryozoan and mollusc debris. The deposit, whose onshore occurrence is mainly restricted to the area around Aldeburgh and Orford, is a series of bioclastic calcarenites and silty sands with shell debris, deposited during a short-lived warm period at the start of the Pliocene Epoch of the Neogene Period. Small areas of the rock formation are found in locations such as Boyton and Tattingstone to the south of Orford as well as offshore at Sizewell.

Crag is a local word for a shelly sand. Coralline Crag has sometimes been used historically in the Suffolk coast area for building and a number of quarries exist. The tower of St Peter's Church in Chillesford is one of only two built using the rock.

See also

 Geology of Suffolk
 List of fossiliferous stratigraphic units in England

References

External links
 Bryozoan fossils in the Coralline Crag rocks of Suffolk

Neogene England
Geography of Suffolk
Escarpments of England